Noeeta pupillata is a species of tephritid or fruit flies in the genus Noeeta of the family Tephritidae.

Distribution
Europe & East Siberia South to central Europe, Ukraine, Caucasus & Mongolia.

References

Tephritinae
Insects described in 1862
Diptera of Europe
Diptera of Asia